Hototogisu may refer to:

Lesser cuckoo (Cuculus poliocephalus), a bird native to Japan
The Cuckoo (novel) or Hototogisu, a novel by Roka Tokutomi
Hototogisu (magazine), a Japanese literary magazine
Hototogisu (film), a 1922 Japanese film
Hototogisu (video game), a video game for the Nintendo Entertainment System
Hototogisu (music), a drone/noise project with Matthew Bower and Marcia Bassett